Russ Marchuk (born September 1946) is a Canadian politician, who was the Saskatchewan Party member elected to the Legislative Assembly of Saskatchewan in the 2011 election for the riding of Regina Douglas Park.  Marchuk won the seat by ousting Saskatchewan New Democratic Party leader Dwain Lingenfelter in his own riding by a shocking 10-point margin. He retired in 2016.

References

Living people
Saskatchewan Party MLAs
Members of the Executive Council of Saskatchewan
Politicians from Regina, Saskatchewan
1946 births